Tre'von Moehrig (born June 16, 1999) is an American football free safety for the Las Vegas Raiders of the National Football League (NFL). He played college football at TCU and was drafted by the Las Vegas Raiders in the second round of the 2021 NFL Draft.

Early years
Moehrig attended Smithson Valley High School in Spring Branch, Texas, just north of San Antonio, where he played cornerback for the Rangers in addition to running track.  Prior to his senior season, he announced via Twitter that he was committed to playing college football at Texas Christian University in Fort Worth, Texas.

College career
As a true freshman at TCU in 2018, Moehrig transitioned to safety and made an immediate impact, starting two games on defense and being named the Horned Frogs' Special Teams MVP for the season. He became a full-time starter as a sophomore in 2019 and finished second on the team with 4 interceptions and 62 tackles.  After the season, he was named 1st team All-Big 12.

Prior to Moehrig's junior season in 2020, he was named as the top defensive back in Texas by Dave Campbell's Texas Football, the nation's top returning safety by Pro Football Focus and a preseason All-American by the Walter Camp Football Foundation.

Professional career

Moehrig was selected by the Las Vegas Raiders in the second round (43rd overall) of the 2021 NFL Draft. He signed his four-year rookie contract on June 21, 2021.

References

External links
Las Vegas Raiders bio
TCU Horned Frogs bio

1999 births
Living people
American football safeties
Las Vegas Raiders players
TCU Horned Frogs football players
People from Comal County, Texas
Players of American football from Texas